Aces Go Places 5: The Terracotta Hit is a 1989 Hong Kong action comedy film directed by Lau Kar-leung with action choreography by Lau Kar-wing. This is the fifth installment in the Aces Go Places film series. It was released in the United States as Mad Mission 5: The Terracotta Hit. It is the last one to feature the same cast members, and the last to be produced by Cinema City before their shut down in 1991.

Plot
King Kong and Baldy, the "Aces," part ways in 1986 after a mission in Thailand to kidnap a woman on her way to marry her boyfriend (a rich man claiming to be her husband enlisted the Aces' services) goes sour. Three years later, figures from the famous Terracotta Army and a Qing Dynasty bronze sword called the "Chinese Excalibur" is stolen during their transport to an exhibition in Hong Kong. Based on pictures that appear in the media, the two men are accused of the heist. By this time, King Kong is running an investment company that has long since been in the red, and Baldy - who sent his wife and son to Canada - is hiding in a Sai Kung houseboat from creditors who lent him money to invest in the stock market.

When a muscular MSS operative called the Chinese Rambo separately visits Baldy and King Kong (with indirect approval from the Hong Kong Police Force command, who have long since disowned them), both men decide to find those who framed them to clear their names.

They discover that a brother-sister tandem calling themselves the "New Aces" took the pictures during the heist and wore face masks of the two men's likenesses while getting away with stealing the Chinese Excalibur. They interrogate them inside Baldy's houseboat, and as the siblings try to escape, they plunge into the water and go back to the house during which a Chinese ship tows the houseboat. All four of them are sent to Beijing and imprisoned to answer for the crime. They are forced to undergo a staged execution until the Chinese Rambo offers them a chance to get out of prison in exchange for helping the Chinese government recover the figures. The four Aces agree to help recover the figures from the White Gloves syndicate. They begin training in martial arts because Beijing specifically orders that the figures must not be damaged by any means.  However, the Chinese Rambo calls off the training, explaining that the Chinese government will try to get the figures back through diplomatic means.

Despite the turn of events, the four Aces band together and proceed with the mission. A furious battle inside the White Gloves' hideout, which even involves the use of the Chinese Excalibur, results in the quartet recovering the figures. King Kong, Baldy, and the New Aces join the Hong Kong police in sending off the Chinese Rambo, who is safeguarding the shipment back to China.

Cast
Samuel Hui as King Kong
Karl Maka as Baldy
Leslie Cheung as Brother thief
Nina Li Chi as Sister thief
Conan Lee as the Chinese Rambo
Melvin Wong as Boss's aide
Ellen Chan as Ellen
Danny Lee as Prisoner
Fennie Yuen as Baldy's niece
Roy Cheung as Murderer King
Maria Cordero as Woman in window
Brad Kerner as White Gloves
Cho Tat-wah as Uncle Wah
Ha Chi-jan as Rambo's assistant
Wayne Archer as Boss's thug
Mark Houghton as Boss's thug
Billy Chong as Boss's thug
James Ha as Boss's thug
Lau Kar-wing as Thai horse rider
Hung Yan-yan as Thai horse rider
Montatip Keawprasert as May
Deborah Grant as Deborah
Lu Yan as Lui Yin
Jim James as police officer
Ernest Mauser as police officer

Box office
This film grossed HK$20,032,206 during its theatrical run from 28 January to 22 February 1989 in Hong Kong.

See also
Aces Go Places (film series)

External links

Aces Go Places V : The Terracotta Hit at Hong Kong Cinemagic

1989 films
1989 action comedy films
1989 martial arts films
Hong Kong action comedy films
Kung fu films
Hong Kong martial arts comedy films
1980s crime comedy films
Hong Kong slapstick comedy films
Films directed by Lau Kar-leung
Hong Kong sequel films
Films set in Hong Kong
Films shot in Hong Kong
Films set in China
Films set in Thailand
Hong Kong detective films
1980s Hong Kong films